Doyle Bramhall II is the first solo studio album by the artist of the same name. It was released September 9, 1996 to mixed reviews.

Track listing
"Song from the Grave" (Malford Milligan, Stu Blank)
"Ain't Goin' Down Slow"
"What You Gonna Do"
"Close to Me"
"True Emotion" (Will Sexton)
"Bleeding from a Scratch" (Will Sexton)
"Time" - instrumental (Wendy Melvoin)
"Part II" (Craig Ross)
"He Stole Our Love Away"
"The Reason I Live" (Lisa Coleman, Will Sexton)
"They Get Together" (Susannah Melvoin, Wendy Melvoin)
"Jealous Sky" (Will Sexton)
"Stay Awhile" (Susannah Melvoin, Lisa Coleman, Wendy Melvoin)

Personnel
Doyle Bramhall II - Bass, Composer, Drums, Guitars (acoustic/electric), Harmonium, Piano, Producer, Tiple, Vocals
Rev. Brady Blade - Drums
Doyle Bramhall - Drums, Guitars, Vocals
Lisa Coleman - Clavinet, Harmonium, Keyboards, Mellotron, Percussion, Piano, Piano, Shaker, Synthesizer, Background Vocals
Suzie Katayama - Cello
Abe Laboriel Jr. - Drums
Susannah Melvoin - Background Vocals
Wendy Melvoin - Bass, Upright Bass, Guitars (acoustic/electric), Percussion, Background Vocals
Andrew Scheps - Drum Programming, Programming
Sheila E. - Congas, Percussion
Technical
Chris Bellman - Mastering
Greg Cathcart & John Srebualus - Assistant Engineer
Jeff Chonis - Technician
Cappy Japngie, Husky & Rich Veltrop - Mixing Assistant
Dave Mcnair & Carmen Rizzo - Mixing
Mark Proct- Associate Producer
Jeff Sheehan & Roger Sommers - Engineer

References

1996 debut albums
Doyle Bramhall II albums
Geffen Records albums